Lawrence Paul Casian (born October 28, 1965), is an American professional baseball player who pitched in Major League Baseball (MLB) from 1990 to 1998. Casian graduated from Lakewood High School in 1983.  Casian was an assistant coach for the baseball team at the University of Portland, he became an area scout for the San Francisco Giants, based in Salem, Oregon, in November.

External links

1965 births
Living people
American expatriate baseball players in Canada
Baseball coaches from California
Baseball players from California
Calgary Cannons players
Cal State Fullerton Titans baseball players
Chicago Cubs players
Chicago White Sox players
Cleveland Indians players
Iowa Cubs players
Kansas City Royals players
Major League Baseball pitchers
Minnesota Twins players
Orlando Twins players
People from Lynwood, California
Portland Beavers players
San Francisco Giants scouts
Sportspeople from Salem, Oregon
Visalia Oaks players